SB-216641 is a drug which is a selective antagonist for the serotonin receptor 5-HT1B, with around 25x selectivity over the closely related 5-HT1D receptor. It is used in scientific research, and has demonstrated anxiolytic effects in animal studies.

References 

5-HT1B antagonists
Oxadiazoles
Benzanilides
Phenol ethers